5511 Cloanthus  is a Jupiter trojan from the Trojan camp, approximately  in diameter. It was discovered on 8 October 1988, by American astronomer couple Carolyn and Eugene Shoemaker at the Palomar Observatory in California. The dark and likely elongated Jovian asteroid is a slow rotator with a long rotation period of possibly 336 hours. It was named after the wandering Trojan Cloanthus from Classical mythology.

Orbit and classification 

Cloanthus is a dark Jovian asteroid in a 1:1 orbital resonance with Jupiter. It is located in the trailing Trojan camp at its  Lagrangian point, 60° behind its orbit . It is also a non-family asteroid of the Jovian background population. It orbits the Sun at a distance of 4.6–5.9 AU once every 12 years (4,385 days; semi-major axis of 5.24 AU). Its orbit has an eccentricity of 0.12 and an inclination of 11° with respect to the ecliptic. The body's observation arc begins with a precovery taken at Palomar in July 1951, more than 37 years prior to its official discovery observation.

Naming 

This minor planet was named from Greco-Roman mythology after the Trojan Cloanthus, a companion of Aeneas in Classical mythology. He is one of the wandering Aeneads who traveled to Italy after the downfall of Troy. At the funeral games for Aeneas' father, Anchises, Cloanthus was the winner of the boat race because he called upon the gods of the sea to help him with his heavier ship. The official naming citation was published by the Minor Planet Center on 12 July 1995. Other Jovian asteroids named after members of the Aeneads include 4827 Dares, 4828 Misenus, 5120 Bitias and 9023 Mnesthus.

Physical characteristics 

Cloanthus is an assumed, carbonaceous C-type asteroid. Most Jupiter trojans are D-types, with the remainder being mostly C and P-type asteroids. It has a V–I color index of 0.890 and a BR color of 1.21 (also see table below).

Rotation period 

In July 2010, a rotational lightcurve of Cloanthus was obtained from photometric observations by Italian astronomer Stefano Mottola using the 1.2-meter telescope at Calar Alto Observatory in Spain. Lightcurve analysis gave a very long rotation period of  hours with a high brightness amplitude of at least 0.49 magnitude, indicative of an elongated, rather than spherical shape. Due to the lightcurve's low quality rating, it is only a potentially slow rotator.

Diameter and albedo 

According to the survey carried out by the NEOWISE mission of NASA's Wide-field Infrared Survey Explorer, Cloanthus measures 39.77 kilometers in diameter and its surface has an albedo of 0.093, while the Collaborative Asteroid Lightcurve Link assumes a standard albedo for a carbonaceous asteroid of 0.057 and calculates a diameter of 48.48 kilometers based on an absolute magnitude of 10.3.

References

External links 
 Asteroid Lightcurve Database (LCDB), query form (info )
 Dictionary of Minor Planet Names, Google books
 Discovery Circumstances: Numbered Minor Planets (5001)-(10000) – Minor Planet Center
 Asteroid 5511 Cloanthus at the Small Bodies Data Ferret
 
 

005511
Discoveries by Carolyn S. Shoemaker
Discoveries by Eugene Merle Shoemaker
Named minor planets
005511
19881008